Bruce Hamilton Hay (23 May 1950 – 1 October 2007) was a Scotland international rugby union player.

Background
Hay was born in Edinburgh and educated at Liberton High School. From there he went on to work as an engineer for the National Coal Board. Latterly he worked as a sales representative.

Rugby Union career

Amateur career

Hay was a fullback. He started his rugby career at junior club Liberton, a team he captained at the age of 18,
He then moved to play for Boroughmuir.

He helped Boroughmuir win the Scottish Unofficial Championship in 1973; and was still in their side when they won the Melrose Sevens in 1976.

Provincial career

While still at Liberton he was capped by Edinburgh District. This was an astonishing feat for a junior club player and his tough tackling reputation was sealed. He carried on representing the district when he moved to Boroughmuir.

International career

It was when Hay moved to Boroughmuir in 1972 that he went on to gain international recognition.

He gained 23 international caps for Scotland and also represented the British and Irish Lions on both their 1977 and 1980 tours, and the Barbarians.

Stats

International debut: 14 June 1975 v New Zealand in Auckland. Lost 24-0
Final appearance: 20 June 1981 v New Zealand in Auckland. Lost 40-15
Scotland: Caps: 23. Tries: 3
Lions Tests: 3 (on 1980 South Africa tour). Tries: 1 (v South Africa)

Death
He was diagnosed with a brain tumour in 2005 and died on 1 October 2007, aged 57.

References

External links
Obituary in The Times, 13 October 2007

1950 births
2007 deaths
Deaths from brain tumor
Neurological disease deaths in Scotland
Deaths from cancer in Scotland
Rugby union players from Edinburgh
Scottish rugby union players
Scotland international rugby union players
British & Irish Lions rugby union players from Scotland
Barbarian F.C. players
Rugby union fullbacks
Boroughmuir RFC players
People educated at Liberton High School
Liberton RFC players
Edinburgh District (rugby union) players